Bracci is an Italian surname. Notable people with the surname include:

 Cecchino Bracci (real name Francesco de Zanobi Bracci) (1528–1544), Italian, pupil of Michelangelo
 Egisto Bracci (1830–1909), Italian architect, active mainly in Florence
 Faustina Bracci Armellini (1785–1857), Italian pastellist
 Francesco Bracci (1879–1967), Italian Cardinal of the Roman Catholic Church
 François Bracci (born 1951), French association football manager and former player
 Marco Bracci (born 1966), former Italian volleyball player
 Pietro Bracci (1700–1773), Italian sculptor working in the late Baroque manner
 Renato Bracci (1904–1975), Italian rower who competed in the 1932 Summer Olympics

Other
 Bracci-Cambini, family represents many centuries of Italian history (IX° Sec.)

Italian-language surnames